Joseph Humpage (22 September 1873 – 1953) was an English footballer who played in the Football League for Burton Wanderers and West Bromwich Albion.

References

1873 births
1953 deaths
English footballers
Association football goalkeepers
English Football League players
Wednesbury Old Athletic F.C. players
West Bromwich Albion F.C. players
Burton Wanderers F.C. players
Hereford Thistle F.C. players
Stourbridge F.C. players